Spiny tree-rats are all found in the rodent family Echimyidae. They are found in the following genera:

 Echimys
 Lonchothrix
 Mesomys
 Makalata
 Pattonomys